Robert Wood Johnson was the name shared by members of the family that descended from the President of Johnson & Johnson:
Robert Wood Johnson I (1845–1910)
Robert Wood Johnson II (1893–1968)
Robert Wood Johnson III (1920–1970)
Robert Wood Johnson IV (born 1947), the current owner of the New York Jets
Robert Wood Johnson V, son of Robert Wood Johnson IV

Organizations
Several organizations and institutions have been named for members of this family:
Robert Wood Johnson Foundation in Princeton, New Jersey
Robert Wood Johnson Medical School in Piscataway, New Jersey, and Camden, New Jersey
Robert Wood Johnson University Hospital in New Brunswick, New Jersey

See also
Robert Ward Johnson, senator
Robert Johnson (disambiguation)